This List of National Snaffle Bit Association Hall of Fame Inductees was created by the National Snaffle Bit Association (NSBA) for the NSBA Hall of Fame to recognize extraordinary athletes, individuals, riders, and horses, in the equestrian sport of Pleasure riding. The NSBA Hall of Fame started inducting members into the hall of fame 1988. The hall of fame was created to recognize these individuals who have contributed significantly to the association. The hall of fame features those who have exerted themselves in maintaining a high level of integrity while advocating for the industry. NSBA members who have impacted the association in a profound manner are considered. Roles such as promoter, breeder, competitor, trainer, and other contributors who donated their time and expertise to assist the association. It is located with the NSBA in Weatherford, Texas. The NSBA Announces 2018 Hall Of Fame Honorees.

Inductees

Equine 
The NSAB has an alliance with American Quarter Horse Association. Some of the NSAB Hall of Fame horses are also American Quarter Horse Hall of Fame members.

Breeding Horse Award Winners 

Source:

Show Horse Award Winners 

Source:

Horse Award Winners from 1988-1998 

Source:

Individuals 

Source:

Riders 

Source:

Horse of the Year 

Source:

Quarter Million Dollar Club 

Source:

Top Money Earners 
The top money earners are tracked for lifetime earnings as follows:

NSBA Top 20 lifetime earners are tracked in the following disciplines:
 Open Hunter Under Saddle
 Open Western Pleasure
 Open Western Riding
 Open Trail
 Non-Pro Hunter Under Saddle
 Non-Pro Western Pleasure
 Non-Pro Western Riding
 Non-Pro Trail
 Open Yearling Longe Line
 Non-Pro Yearling Longe Line
Source:

And the top 50 lifetime earners are tracking in the following disciplines:
 Open
 NonPro
Source:

See also
 Horse show
 National Reining Horse Association
 National Reining Horse Association Hall of Fame
 National Reining Horse Association Champions and Awards
 National Reined Cow Horse Association
 National Reined Cow Horse Association Champions
 National Reined Cow Horse Association Hall of Fame
 Western riding
 Western saddle

References

External links
 Official Site

Western-style riding
Horse showing and exhibition
Equestrian organizations
Equestrianism
Halls of fame in Illinois
Sports halls of fame
Cowboy halls of fame